Wuhu Rail Transit is a two-line monorail rapid transit system in Wuhu, Anhui, China. Both lines use Bombardier Innovia Monorail 300 trains manufactured under a joint venture with CRRC. Line 1 opened on 3 November 2021, with Line 2 opening on 28 December 2021.

History

Line 1

Line 1 has been under construction since December 2016. 

On 25 September 2021, Wuhu Rail Transit Line 1 launched a monthly long trial with 10,000 passengers per week expected to test the line for free.

Line 1 opened on 3 November 2021.

Line 2

The first phase of Line 2 started construction in 2018. 

Line 2 opened on 28 December 2021.

Future development

Line 2 (Phase 2)
The second phase of Line 2 is under planning and will be completed by 2025. It will extend Line 2 to Jiangbei railway station.

Other plans
The system is planned to comprise five lines.

References

Wuhu
Wuhu Rail Transit
Rapid transit in China
2021 establishments in China

Monorails
Monorails in China